Danni Nicholls is a multi award nominated British Americana singer-songwriter. Her song, First Cuckoo of Spring, was featured in the TV series Sons of Anarchy (season 7 2014). Nicholls has also toured and opened for artists such as Shakin' Stevens, Lucinda Williams and The Secret Sisters.

Early years
Growing up in Bedfordshire, England on the American roots music of her Anglo-Indian grandmother's record collection, at 16, Nicholls inherited, a 1963 Burns London shortscale electric jazz guitar from her uncle Heathcliff. The guitar is rumoured to have once belonged to English rock n roll artist Billy Fury. She has a BA in drama from Kingston University (2004-2007). She studied songwriting and the music business in Brighton, England while promoting her own music nights in several venues.

Career

2009–2012
Nicholls toured throughout the UK during this period to promote her two released EPs, Heavy Shoes (2009) and Time (2012).

2012–2014
Nicholls recorded her first full studio album, A Little Redemption, in Nashville, Tennessee at the Yackland Studios East Nashville, produced by Chris Donohue. The team included engineer and mixer Stephen Leiweke and musicians Will Kimbrough, Al Perkins, Billy Livsey, Jordan Hamlin, Brigitte DeMeyer and Butterfly Boucher amongst others. The album was released 1 July 2013. First Cuckoo of Spring from the album was featured in the TV series Sons of Anarchy (season 7 2014).

2015–2016
Nicholls also recorded her second studio album Mockingbird Lane in Nashville, produced by Chris Donohue, engineered and mixed by Stephen Leiweke, and mastered by Alex McCullough. Musicians included Will Kimbrough, Ralph T Lofton, Brandy Zdan, Chris Donohue and Stephen Leiweke amongst others. The album was released 23 October 2015.

2017
Nicholls' second studio album Mockingbird Lane was nominated at The Americana Music Association UK 2017 Awards  for UK Album of the Year and performed her song Beautifully Broken at the St John's Church in Hackney, London. Later that year, Nicholls performed an official showcase at The Americana Music Association AmericanaFest 2017 in Nashville. In addition to her own headline tours in the UK, Nicholls performed at festivals in the UK and Denmark, notably several sets including the Women's Circle (also featuring Kaia Kater from Canada, Tami Neilson from New Zealand along with Laura Mo and Dorthe Gerlach both from Denmark) at the Tonder Festival in Denmark. Nicholls also opened as support for Lucinda Williams at the De La Warr Pavilion Bexhill-on-Sea  for one of only two shows in the UK and completed 28 dates on a full UK with Shakin' Stevens on his Echoes of our Time tour at venues such as O2 Shepherd's Bush, the Blackpool Opera House and the Glasgow Royal Concert Hall. She released a live album, The Vintage TV Recordings, with a launch show in April at the St Pancras Old Church in London. The album is made up of songs recorded and aired by Vintage TV UK from three sessions: Live Sessions from Dingwalls, Camden, London that featured Nicholls with a full band, Live At The Water Rats, London supporting Toyah Willcox as a duo with guitarist Max Milligan and Live With from the Metropolis Studios. In April 2017, Nicholls was featured as Artist of the Month by Caffe Nero.

2018

In 2018, Nicholls was nominated for UK Artist of the Year at The Americana Music Association UK 2018 Awards and was nominated for Best Country/Folk Act for the 2018 Unsigned Music Awards. Nicholls performed an official showcase at the Folk Alliance International conference in Kansas City followed by a support tour for The Secret Sisters in the UK and Ireland and festival appearances at the Black Deer Festival and Long Road Festival. During the summer, Danni returned to Nashville to record her new studio album The Melted Morning, planned for release in spring 2019, at the Moxe Studio with producer Jordan Brooke Hamlin and featuring artists The Secret Sisters and Kyshona Armstrong.

2019

Third studio album The Melted Morning is released 12 April 2019 worldwide. Nicholls tours the UK as a trio with musicians Tom Dibb and Mark Lewis. The song 'Hear Your Voice' from The Melted Morning is nominated for UK Song of the Year by the Americana Music Association UK. 
Nicholls showcases at AmericanaFest, Nashville.

2020

Nicholls opens the 2020 Americana Music Association UK Awards show at Troxy, London with 'Song of the Year' nominated 'Hear Your Voice'

Discography

Videos

Nominations

References

Living people
1985 births
British women singer-songwriters
21st-century British women  singers